Linda G. Mills is an American social worker and academic administrator. She is the president-designate of New York University. She will assume the presidency on July 1, 2023.

Education 
Mills received a B.A. in history and social thought from the University of California, Irvine in 1979. She received a J.D. from the University of California College of the Law, San Francisco in 1983 and an M.S.W. from San Francisco State University in 1986. She earned a Ph.D. in Health Policy in 1994 from Brandeis University, where she was a Pew Scholar. She was admitted to the California Bar in 1983 and first became a Licensed Clinical Social Worker in 1990.

Career 

From 1994 to 1998, Mills was a Lecturer at the UCLA School of Law and an Assistant Professor in the UCLA School of Public Policy and Social Research. In 2002, she was named Vice Provost (and in 2006 Senior Vice Provost) for Undergraduate Education and University Life. She started as NYU's Vice Chancellor and Senior Vice Provost for Global Programs and University Life in 2012.

Mills joined New York University (NYU) as an Associate Professor of Social Work in 1999, and was promoted to full Professor in 2001. She is the Lisa Ellen Goldberg Professor of Social Work, Public Policy, and Law, and serves as Executive Director of the NYU Center on Violence and Recovery. Mills is the president-designate of New York University. She succeeds Andrew D. Hamilton on July 1, 2023. She is set to become the first woman to serve as the University's president.

Research 
Mills' principal areas of scholarly focus are trauma, bias, and domestic violence. She has written articles for publications including Harvard Law Review, Cornell Law Review, Journal of Experimental Criminology, and Nature: Human Behavior, among others. Her books have been published by Princeton University Press, University of Michigan Press, Springer, and Basic Books.  As a filmmaker, she has produced award-winning films that have debuted at Tribeca Film Festival and the Los Angeles Jewish Film Festival and have been shown in Abu Dhabi, Austria, and Tunisia, among other countries. Of Many: Then and Now aired on ABC

References 

Year of birth missing (living people)
Living people
New York University faculty
Presidents of New York University
Brandeis University alumni
San Francisco State University alumni
University of California, Irvine alumni
University of California alumni
Women heads of universities and colleges
American social workers
20th-century American women lawyers
UCLA School of Law faculty
UCLA Luskin School of Public Affairs faculty